Antonio David (1698–1750) was an Italian painter.

David was the official painter for the Jacobite court living in Rome. David painted primarily portraits, and for twenty years worked almost exclusively with the House of Stuart. He died in 1750.

References

1698 births
1750 deaths
Painters from Rome
17th-century Italian painters
Italian male painters
18th-century Italian painters
18th-century Italian male artists